T Cephei is a Mira variable star in the constellation Cepheus. Located approximately  distant, it varies between magnitudes 5.2 and 11.3 over a period of around 388 days.

If it were in the place of the Sun, its photosphere would at least engulf the orbit of Mars. This star is believed to be in a late stage of its life, blowing off its own atmosphere to form a white dwarf in a distant future.

See also
VV Cephei
R Cancri
Mira
S Cassiopeiae

References

External links
  T Cephei in VizieR

Cepheus (constellation)
Mira variables
Cephei, T
202012
M-type giants
8113
104451
Durchmusterung objects
Emission-line stars